Frederick Wills may refer to:

 Sir Frederick Wills, 1st Baronet (1838–1909), director of W.D. & H.O. Wills, which later merged into the Imperial Tobacco Company, Liberal Unionist MP
 Frederick Wills (cinematographer) (1870–1955), pioneering Australian cinematographer
 Frederick Wills (Guyana) (died 1992), foreign affairs minister of Guyana in 1970
 Frederick Noel Hamilton Wills (1887–1927), English educator